Zoidze is a Georgian surname. Notable people with the surname include:

 Irakli Zoidze (born 1969), Georgian footballer
 Ramaz Zoidze (born 1996), Georgian Greco-Roman wrestler
 Vissarion Zoidze (born 1988), Russian footballer of Georgian origin

Surnames of Georgian origin
Georgian-language surnames